Knulp (subtitled Three Stories from Knulp's Life) is a short story by Hermann Hesse, published in 1915 by S. Fischer Verlag. The three stories about a vagrant that Hesse wrote between 1907 and 1914 are among his “Garbersau” stories.

Early Spring
It is mid-February and the weather is terrible. Knulp, discharged from the hospital but feverish again, slips into the house of tanner Emil Rothfuss in Lächstetten. The journeyman's bed is empty. Years ago, Knulp hit the road with him. He doesn't want to commit to the length of his stay just yet - it is very important for him to be able to spend the next day as he pleases. At the same time, he asks for an entry in his travel book -the previous bookkeeping entries impute the impeccable course of an apparently hard-working life to him.

After a day of bed rest, he sneaks out of the house, wanders around the city in the evening and chats with some of the people he meets. Later, while chatting from window to window, he also gets to know Bärbele, a young girl from the Black Forest who only started working in Lächstetten a week ago. Knulp gains her confidence through the skill of the artificial whistle.

The next morning, he spends a lot of time exploring the town. He meets old loose acquaintances again and tries to talk to the craftsmen everywhere. Since he knows a little about all trades and has mastered their technical terminology and their distinguishing marks, he is always happy to be mistaken as one of them. An old acquaintance of Knulp, Schlotterbeck, a tailor with many children, who has settled in Lächstetten, envies Knulp because he is so carefree. Knulp advises the tailor that he should be happy to have his children, and he reveals to him that he has a two-year-old son himself, who was adopted by strangers after the mother's death because of concealed paternity. He has no contact with him and can only see him from afar on occasion. As he continues to walk through the town, he learns some local news and tells news from other places. He rejoices in the loose ties that he forms here as an old acquaintance with a sedentary lifestyle. He also finds out where the dance will be in the evening and, with a great deal of persuasion, succeeds in convincing Bärbele to attend. That is far more interesting to him than the importunities of the life-hungry tanner's wife, whom he knows how to escape. He also makes a poor excuse and turns down an invitation from the Rothfuss couple, who would like to spend the evening with Knulp. Instead, he goes to the dance with Bärbele in the evening. Knulp and Bärbele dance together. Afterwards, he brings her almost to her door. Everyone kisses everyone goodbye. Then, Bärbele realizes that Knulp is a have-not. She gives him a coin from her small purse. Knulp feels that spring is coming and has to go hiking. In the tramp's intact memory, trained at the Latin school, the topology of the landscape around Lächstetten with all overnight accommodations etc. is reliably preserved.

My Memory of Knulp

The narrator is on the move with Knulp in the hot summer. In a farming village, Knulp amuses a few young girls with his antics and tricks. The narrator holds back. The two itinerant boys climb over the cemetery wall. Knulp breaks off a cemetery flower and puts it on his hat. Knulp philosophizes in the grass. The beautiful is always ephemeral. Before they spend the night outdoors, Knulp shares one of his dreams. It is about the unattainability of what was once familiar. He left his parents and his childhood sweetheart. Unfortunately, there is nothing he can do about it. He reflects on the diversity of souls. What he considers the most important thing about himself, perhaps his soul, his parents find secondary. Children can inherit many qualities from their parents, but not their soul. Everyone has their own.

Knulp proudly greets the new day by singing to the sun. The two wandering boys are jolly all summer long. When the muggy evening comes, the narrator becomes more and more cheerful and Knulp more and more quiet. The next morning, the narrator wakes up late and Knulp is gone. The narrator is overcome by that loneliness that Knulp was talking about all the time. Everyone is alone.

The End

In October, Knulp walks to his birthplace in Gerbersau, when a former neighbor from the Latin school approaches him. This country doctor Dr. Machold recognizes that Knulp has a lung disease and doesn't belong on the street. Dr. Machold copied from Knulp at the time. Now he wants revenge. So he takes Knulp home and puts him to bed because Knulp's disease is advanced. Dr. Machold wants to get Knulp at the Oberstetten hospital, but Knulp wants to go to his birthplace. Dr. Machold is against that. Before the carriage ride to Gerbersau, Dr. Machold asks why the talented Knulp did not use his gifts in a demanding job but only used them for himself. Knulp corrects that others have enjoyed his jokes too. As for the question, Knulp answers why he left the Latin school back then. When he was almost 13, he loved Franziska. Franziska, who was two years older than him, didn't like any students. Knulp desperately wanted to be her sweetheart and dropped out of Latin school. Franziska took another. From then on, Knulp went downhill. Although he still had acquaintances and lovers, he was no longer able to rely on someone's word or bind himself to a word. He has experienced a lot of freedom and beauty but has always remained alone.

The carriage ride to the Gerbersau hospital begins. Knulp can be driven to his birthplace but stays away from the hospital. Instead, he seeks out the places of his childhood – recognizes some things that still exist, mourns things that have disappeared forever. After asking questions and finding out that Franziska is no longer alive, he leaves town. Knulp meets a stone-cutter - they have also known each other from before - who makes him think that he will have to take responsibility for his life if it comes to dying, and that despite his talents nothing has come of it. Knulp hopes for a God who won't ask him why he didn't become a magistrate but instead will take him, the child's head, in a friendly manner.

It drives the vagabond back onto the street. For two weeks he has been circling Gerbersau on foot. When winter sets in with snowstorms, Knulp comes to the end of the road. He's dead tired and spitting up blood. In his thoughts, he stands before God and talks to him incessantly. Knulp complains about the futility of his failed life and thinks it should have ended better sooner. God reminds him of many happy, beautiful times. Knulp also regrets his badness towards Lisabeth, whom he sees with their boy on his arm. God counters that she has never been angry with him and has received much good from him, which outweighs the pain inflicted on her. Knulp had to be a light-footed and vagabond in order to be able to carry a piece of childish folly and children's laughter everywhere.

God stands by his side and receives him:

"See," said God, "I could not have used you otherwise than as you are. You hiked in my name and always had to bring home a little homesickness for freedom with the sedentary people. You have done foolish things and been mocked in my name; I myself was mocked in you and loved in you. After all, you are my child and my brother and a part of me, and you have tasted nothing and suffered nothing that I did not experience with you.”

"Yes," said Knulp, nodding his head heavily. "Yes, it's like that, I've actually always known it."

Testimonies

Stefan Zweig : "(...) Knulp , this lonely latecomer of a romantic world, seems to me an imperishable piece of Little Germany, a spitzweg picture and at the same time full of pure music like a folk song." 

Hermann Hesse, 1935 in a letter to a reader: "In contrast to some fashion programmes, I do not consider it the poet's task to set up norms for his readers for life and humanity and to be omniscient and authoritative. The poet portrays what attracts him, and characters like Knulp are very attractive to me. They are not "useful," but they do very little harm, much less than some useful ones, and it is not my business to judge them. Rather, I believe: if talented and inspired people like Knulp find no place in their environment, then the environment is just as complicit as Knulp himself." 

According to Theodore Ziolkowski , Knulp's 'absolute freedom is always accompanied by a sense of guilt'. Knulp wanted to bring "a little homesickness for freedom" into the everyday life of the "normal", the faithful. But Knulp finally had to resign himself to the fact that he hadn't achieved "anything really valuable" for "ordinary people".

Editions

First edition from 1915: Three stories from Knulp's life (Fischer's library of contemporary novels. 6th series, volume 10). Fischer, Berlin 1915.

Three stories from Knulp's life. With drawings by Niklaus Stoecklin, Fretz & Wasmuth, Zurich 1944.

Three stories from Knulp's life. With 16 stone drawings by Karl Walser . Suhrkamp, Frankfurt am Main 1963. (Library Suhrkamp . Volume 75). 21st edition. Suhrkamp, Frankfurt am Main 1988, ISBN 3-518-01075-1

Three stories from Knulp's life. Suhrkamp, Frankfurt am Main 1988, ISBN 3-518-38071-0

Literature

Reiner Poppe: Peter Camenzind. Under the wheel. Knulp. (King's explanations and materials. Volume 17). 8th, revised edition. Bange, Hollfeld 1999, ISBN 3-8044-1621-7 

Heimo Schwilk: Hermann Hesse. The life of the glass bead player. Munich 2012, ISBN 978-3-492-05302-0, p. 119.

Gunnar Decker: Hermann Hesse. The wanderer and his shadow. Biography. Munich 2012, ISBN 978-3-446-23879-4 , pp. 218 and 253.

Hermann Hesse: Knulp. Three stories from Knulp's life. Suhrkamp, Frankfurt am Main 1988, ISBN 3-518-38071-0 , p. 123.

1923 in Neue Freie Presse , quoted from: Siegfried Unseld : Hermann Hesse. Work and impact history . Insel, Frankfurt am Main 1987, ISBN 3-458-32812-2 , p. 61.

Unseld: Hermann Hesse. Frankfurt am Main 1987, p. 58.

Theodore Ziolkowski: The writer Hermann Hesse. Frankfurt am Main 1979, ISBN 3-518-04748-5 , p. 206.

1915 books
Hermann Hesse